Saint Vincent and the Grenadines competed in the 2010 Commonwealth Games held in Delhi, India, from 3 to 14 October 2010.

Medalists

See also
 2010 Commonwealth Games

References

External links
 Times of India

Nations at the 2010 Commonwealth Games
2010 in Saint Vincent and the Grenadines